The 1986–87 Iraq FA Cup was the tenth edition of the Iraq FA Cup as a clubs-only competition. The tournament was won by Al-Rasheed for the first time, beating Al-Jaish 4–3 on penalties in the final after a 1–1 draw. Al-Rasheed also won the 1986–87 Iraqi National League to complete the double.

Matches

Final

References

External links
 Iraqi Football Website

Iraq FA Cup
Cup